L'Axone is an indoor arena, located in Montbéliard, France. It was inaugurated 5 April 2009. The capacity of the arena is 6,400 people.

References

Indoor arenas in France
Sports venues in Doubs
Sports venues completed in 2009
21st-century architecture in France